was a series of suicidal air attacks by Imperial Japanese forces during the Battle of Okinawa against Allied fleets in the waters around Okinawa, as part of Operation Ten-Go. The name of the operation, "Kikusui" (Japanese: 菊水, "Chrysanthemum Water"), comes from the hata-jirushi of the samurai Kusunoki Masashige.

Background
After the Battle of the Philippine Sea, the Imperial Japanese Navy was close to decimation, and was no longer in a position to challenge the United States-led Allied fleet. But after Task Force 58 started to mount air raids on Kyushu in March 1945, the approach of the United States fleet affirmed to the Japanese military that the Allies were in dominance in the seas around Japan, and that so-called normal tactics had little effect in the face of overwhelming Allied firepower. To counter the Allies, extremist views regarding the use of weaponry started to appear among the Japanese military.

During the Battle of Leyte Gulf, Japanese kamikaze aircraft had successfully sunk the escort carrier  and during the Invasion of Lingayen Gulf, kamikaze aircraft had sunk the escort carrier USS Ommaney Bay. In addition, kamikaze aircraft had caused heavy damage to 2 US Navy aircraft carriers during air battles off Kyushu. These incidents convinced the Imperial General Headquarters of the effectiveness of kamikaze attacks, and that they were an effective solution to turn the deteriorating war situation around; as a result, massive kamikaze attacks were planned against the US Navy.

On 20 March 1945, the Imperial General Headquarters commenced Operation Ten-Go to defend Okinawa against the impending Allied invasion. Air groups mobilized included Carrier Division 5, 1st Mobile Land-based Air Fleet (Kyushu, commanded by Vice Admiral Matome Ugaki), 5th Land-based Air Fleet (Formosa), and the Imperial Japanese Army 6th Aviation Army's 8th Flying Division (Formosa, commanded by Lieutenant General Kenji Yamamoto). These forces undertook preparations for Operation Kikusui (which was an Imperial Japanese Navy code name; the Imperial Japanese Army referred to it as the "total air assault"), and stationed over 3,000 various combat aircraft in Kyushu.

On 1 April 1945, the Imperial General Headquarters issued commands for "the conversion to special attack aircraft of all Army and Navy warplanes"; from then on, the vast majority of Japanese warplanes were used as kamikaze aircraft. On that same day, the Allies commenced Operation Iceberg. To hold back the Allied advance, orders for the Imperial Japanese Navy's "Operation Kikusui I" and the Imperial Japanese Army's "1st total air assault"  were issued on the morning of 6 April. Simultaneously, the Hibiscus Fleet, consisting of new attack planes (Tenzans, Gingas, Hiryuus and Suiseis) belonging to the Imperial Japanese Navy participated in night attacks against the Allied fleet.

Battles

Operation Kikusui I
On 6 April 1945, the Japanese military commenced Operation Kikusui I (referred to by the Army as the 1st total air assault), with 391 Navy planes and 133 Army planes (of which 215 Navy planes and 82 Army planes were kamikazes) taking part. US Navy anti-air radar picket destroyers deployed in the waters off Okinawa bore the brunt of the attack. At 12:26 pm, the destroyer Haynsworth became the first warship struck. The destroyers Bush and Colhoun were sunk by kamikazes and the destroyers Newcomb and Leutze took heavy damage; the battleship Maryland and 10 other destroyers were targeted by kamikazes as well. The US Navy claimed the loss of 3 destroyers, 1 amphibious warfare ship and 2 munitions transports, along with over 10 other ships heavily damaged.

During Operation Kikusui I, the Surface Special Attack Force, consisting of the battleship Yamato, the light cruiser Yahagi, and 8 destroyers, under the command of Vice-Admiral Seiichi Itō, left for Okinawa to support ground defense operations there, but were repulsed by over 300 carrier aircraft belonging to Admiral Mitscher's Task Force 58 at Bou-no-Misaki, between Kyushu and the Ryukyu Islands, on 7 April; this came to be known in Japan as the Naval Battle of Bou-no-Misaki. The Imperial Japanese Navy lost the battleship Yamato, the light cruiser Yahagi, and 4 destroyers. The Japanese military continued air attacks between 8 and 11 April, and on 11 April the aircraft carrier Enterprise and the battleship Missouri were damaged by kamikaze aircraft, and the aircraft carrier Essex took hull damage below the waterline.

Operation Kikusui II
Operation Kikusui II commenced on 12 April, and consisted of 354 Navy planes and 124 Army planes (of which 103 Navy planes and 72 Army planes were kamikazes). Main achievements by the operation include hits on the battleships Tennessee and Idaho; and at least eight other U.S. Navy warships. The human-operated flying bomb Ohka first appeared in Operation Kikusui II; this flying bomb was carried by bombers and was more difficult for US forces to shoot down due to its small size, light weight and high speed. The destroyer Mannert L. Abele became the first and only US Navy ship to be sunk by this type of bomb.Operation Kikusui III
Operation Kikusui III commenced on 16 April, and consisted of 415 Navy planes and 92 Army planes (of which 176 Navy planes and 52 Army planes were kamikazes). Main achievements by the operation include sinking the destroyer Pringle, as well as damaging the aircraft carrier Intrepid and destroyer Laffey, the latter taking six kamikaze and four bomb hits from 22 attackers, earning her the nickname "The Ship That Would Not Die".

Operation Kikusui IV
Operation Kikusui IV took place from 21 to 29 April, and consisted of 845 Navy planes (of which 126 were kamikazes) and 11 Army planes. Only 3 destroyers were damaged.

Due to Japanese kamikaze attacks in April 1945, US Navy losses in the seas around Okinawa began to climb. With the start of Operation Kikusui V, the US Navy carrier fleet began to receive attention by the kamikazes.

Operation Kikusui V

On 3 May, 449 planes of the Okinawa Aviation Fleet (including 160 kamikazes) commenced Operation Kikusui V. Main achievements include sinking 2 destroyers, damaging 1 escort aircraft carrier, and damaging the British aircraft carrier Formidable.

Operation Kikusui VI

Operation Kikusui VI commenced on 11 May, and consisted of 345 planes (including 86 kamikazes); attacks from 12 to 15 May consisted of 237 planes (including 47 kamikazes). The most significant achievement in these attacks was major damage to Mitscher's flagship, the aircraft carrier Bunker Hill: 2 kamikaze aircraft; the first piloted by Sub Lieutenant Seizō Yasunori, the second by Ensign Kiyoshi Ogawa struck Bunker Hill and triggered large explosions, but did not sink her as a result of improved damage control capabilities on part of US Navy personnel; however, the damage was severe enough that Bunker Hill did not return to the battlefield before the end of the war. Mitscher transferred his flag to the aircraft carrier Enterprise after being evacuated off Bunker Hill. Among the crew, 352 sailors and pilots were killed, 41 disappeared and 264 were wounded.

On 14 May, Mitscher's flagship, Enterprise, was heavily damaged by one kamikaze pilot, Lt. Shunsuke Tomiyasu, resulting in 13 deaths and 68 people wounded. The ship withdrew from the battlefield. As a result, Mitscher transferred his flag to the carrier Randolph.

Operation Kikusui VII
Operation Kikusui VII took place between 23 and 25 May, and consisted of 387 Navy planes and 174 Army planes (of which 107 Navy planes and 61 Army planes were kamikazes). However, the achievements were quite small compared to the previous operation, with only 1 transport sunk and 1 escort aircraft carrier damaged.

Operation Kikusui VIII
Operation Kikusui VIII took place between 28 and 29 May, and consisted of 217 Navy planes and 71 Army planes (of which 51 Navy planes and 57 Army planes were kamikazes). Due to reduced airstrike capabilities on part of the Japanese military, achievements were small, only sinking 1 destroyer, the USS Drexler and damaging several ships.

Operation Kikusui IX
Operation Kikusui IX took place between 3 and 7 June, and consisted of 367 Navy planes and 71 Army planes (of which 23 Navy planes and 31 Army planes were kamikazes). Main achievements include damage to the battleship USS Mississippi on 5 June, one escort aircraft carrier and the heavy cruiser USS Louisville on 5 June. In the Okinawa land offensive, the United States had taken the prefectural capital, Naha, and the Japanese were forced into the southernmost tip of Okinawa Island.

Operation Kikusui X
Due to the Japanese defeat in the Okinawa land offensive, the Imperial General Headquarters launched one final Kikusui operation between 16 and 22 June, while making preparations for a final showdown on the Japanese home islands. Operation Kikusui X consisted of 271 Navy planes (of which 67 were kamikazes); it achieved only 1 destroyer sunk; and one escort carrier ship damaged.

Aftermath
In total, the Imperial Japanese Navy deployed 940 aircraft and the Imperial Japanese Army deployed 887 aircraft, each of varying types, in Operation Kikusui. Of these, 133 planes scored hits, and 122 planes scored near misses. Casualties include 2,045 Navy aviators and 1,022 Army aviators killed (not including losses other than kamikazes). If non-kamikaze aircraft are included, 2,258 aircraft were lost. On the Allied side, 36 ships were sunk (but no cruisers or larger were sunk), 218 ships were damaged (including 8 aircraft carriers, 3 battleships, 2 cruisers and 33 destroyers), and 763 carrier aircraft were lost; casualties include over 4,900 killed or missing, and 4,824 wounded.

Although the Kikusui kamikazes inflicted severe damage, no heavy Allied ships were sunk. One reason for this is the outstanding damage control capabilities on part of the Allies, successfully preventing many ships from sinking. Another reason is the poor training and discipline of the Japanese aircrews, which led them to attempt to sink whatever ship was in sight without effectively identifying their targets; as a result, the massive number of Allied destroyers effectively diluted the kamikaze attacks on large Allied ships, and led to the preservation of most of the Allied naval aviation firepower despite severe losses.

Vice Admiral Matome Ugaki, the officer in charge of Operation Kikusui, performed one "final kamikaze attack" after hearing of Japan's surrender, piloting a Suisei, and was shot down and killed in the seas around Okinawa.

References
Wang Shu-Jun, Pacific War: U.S.A. vs. Japan'', part 2, East Books, Taipei (1993)

World War II operations and battles of the Pacific theatre
Battles involving Japan
Battles involving the United States
Kamikaze